Fish Out of Water is a 2009 documentary film by director Ky Dickens. The film showcases the seven Bible verses that are most often used to condemn homosexuality and same-sex marriage.  Dickens spoke with ministers on both sides of the debate surrounding homosexuality and the Bible for the film.

Awards and recognition
Documentary centerpiece - Reeling Lesbian and Gay International Film Festival for 2009
Audience Choice runner-up - Wichita's Tall Grass Film Festival
Jury Prize for Best Documentary - Show Me Social Justice Film Festival
Best Festival Release with a Lesbian Character runner up - After Ellen Visibility Award

References

External links

2009 films
American documentary films
2009 documentary films
Documentary films about LGBT and Christianity
2009 LGBT-related films
2000s English-language films
2000s American films